Mohammad Yahya bin Lampong is a Malaysian politician from PKR. He was the Member of Parliament for Kota Belud from 1982 to 1986 and Member of Sabah State Legislative Assembly for Tempasuk from 1985 to 1986. He was also the Deputy Minister of Rural Development.

Politics 
In 1990, he joined UMNO after USNO was dissolved and he became the Division Chief of UMNO Tanjung Aru. In 1999, he left UMNO and join BERSEKUTU but rejoined UMNO within 12 hours. On 23 August 2001, he was removed as the Division Chief of UMNO Tanjung Aru by the Disciplinary Committee. In 2012, he quitted UMNO again and joined PKR. He said that he decided to leave UMNO due to Nik Aziz. He was also the Vice President of Protem Perkasa till 2009.

Election result

Honours 
  :
  Commander of the Order of Kinabalu (PGDK) - Datuk (1998)

References 

21st-century Malaysian politicians
Malaysian Muslims
Place of birth missing (living people)
Bajau people
Independent politicians in Malaysia
Former United Malays National Organisation politicians
People's Justice Party (Malaysia) politicians
Members of the Dewan Rakyat
Members of the Sabah State Legislative Assembly
Living people
Year of birth missing (living people)
Commanders of the Order of Kinabalu